Nimbus Note is a note-taking app designed by Nimbus Web company based in Cleveland, Ohio. The app is cross-platform, for Android, iOS, macOS, and Microsoft Windows.

Technical overview 
The app allows users to create notes with document or photo attachments, build to-do lists and synchronize them with user's Nimbus Note account to store them online.

Nimbus Note has an integrated text editor that allows users to change the text style in different ways, enabling you to insert varying data structures such as pictures, tables, hyperlinks, and various lists. Also, the editor comes with indentation control, paragraph layout customization, superscript and subscript options.

Nimbus Note allows sorting and categorizing of notes by various criteria. The notes also can be tagged so that user can find them using the dedicated search function.

The app also has a web clipper feature that allows to capture anything online (an article, an image, or a comment, for example) and save it in the user's Nimbus account.

Nimbus Note for Windows supports importing notes from Evernote, text and Microsoft Word files.

The free version only allows for 100 MB of uploads a month, with a note size limit of 10MB. However, users can upgrade to the Pro version.

Critical reception 
Mihaela Teodorovici of Softpedia gave the app four out of five stars, calling it, "an advanced note taking application that enables you to create and organize your notes and to-do lists in a comfortable manner." She praised app's "clean look of the interface," the integrated text editor and stated that, "one important advantage is that it can sync the notes with the Nimbus servers, thus enabling you to access them from any other device".

Thorin Klosowski of Lifehacker stated that "Nimbus Note isn’t as well known as Apple Notes or OneNote, but it works pretty much the same way" and took note of the similarity between Nimbus Note and Evernote.

Ira Arellano of YugaTech listed the app on her list of "5 Recommended Software for Writing," which comprises alternative apps for Evernote and Microsoft OneNote.

References

External links 
 
 
 
 
 

Note-taking software
Web annotation
Cloud storage
Proprietary cross-platform software
Social bookmarking
Productivity software